Jason Hamutenya Ndadi (born 1926 in Ouhongo, South West Africa, today Namibia, died 1977 in Angola), also known as Wanehepo, was a Namibian liberation fighter and co-founder of the Ovamboland People's Organization (OPO), the predecessor organization of SWAPO.

Hamutenya died in a traffic accident and was initially buried in the Hainyeko Training Center Cemetery near Lubango in Angola. The body was relocated to his home town of Ouhongo on 6 May 2005.

A street in Windhoek's Olympia suburb was renamed after Ndadi in 2007.

Literature and movies
 Ndadi, Tshoombe. Wanehepo: a Biography of Late Comrade Jason Hamutenya Ndadi (Wanehepo) 1926-1977. Brighton Polytechnic, 1985.
 Wanehepo: The Return of a Namibian Hero. Namibia 2006, 57 minutes.

References

1926 births
1977 deaths
Ovambo people
National heroes of Namibia
Members of SWAPO
People's Liberation Army of Namibia personnel
Road incident deaths in Angola